Auraiya is a city and a municipal board in Auraiya district  in the state of Uttar Pradesh, India. NH 19 passes through the center of the town. Phaphund railway station is nearest Railway Station. Saifai Airstrip is the nearest aviation facility, having limited private use. Nearest commercial airport is the Kanpur Airport.Before becoming the district headquarters, it was the tehsil headquarters of Etawah district.  This district is under Kanpur Mandal. [1] [2] [3] This is the heroic place of Sengar Rajputs. Sengar dynasty Kanardhani Maharajadhiraj Vishok Dev was married to Devkala, sister of Maharaja Jaichand Gaharwar (Rathore) of Kannauj. He had received this entire area in dowry. The famous Devkali temple here was also built by him in the name of his wife Devkali.  There are many famous villages of Kshatriya in which Ayana, Bhartaul, Jaswantpur, Bhurepur Kalan, Bhurepur Khurd, Sikharna, Fareha, Anepur, Senganpur, Barbatpur, Roshangpur, Manpur, Phaphund, Aseva are very famous villages.

History 

On 17 September 1997, two tehsils named Auraiya and Bidhuna were separated from district Etawah to form the new district named as Auraiya. Ajitmal is the new tehsil of Auraiya district. It is situated on National Highway 02  (Mughal Road), 64 km. to the east of Etawah city and 105 km. in west of Kanpur city.

Modern History 
Under The Rajputs  Before becoming the district headquarters, it was the tehsil headquarters of Etawah district.  This district is under Kanpur Mandal. [1] [2] [3] This is the heroic place of Sengar Rajputs.  Sengar dynasty Kanardhani Maharajadhiraj Shri Vishok Dev was married to Devkala, sister of Maharaja Jaichand Gaharwar (Rathore) of Kannauj.  He had received this entire area in dowry.  The famous Devkali temple here was also built by him in the name of his wife Devkali.  There are many famous villages of Kshatriya in which Ayana, Bhartaul, Jaswantpur, Bhurepur Kalan, Bhurepur Khurd, Sikharna, Fareha, Anepur, Senganpur, Barbatpur, Roshangpur, Manpur, Phaphund, Aseva are very famous villages.

Under the Rohillas
In 1760, Ahmad Shah Durrani invaded India; he was opposed in 1761 by the Marathas on the field of Panipat and inflicted on them a signal defeat. Among other Maratha chieftains Govind Rao Pandit lost his life in the action. Before his departure from India, the Durrani chief consigned large tracts of country to the Rohilla chieftains, and while Dhunde Khan received Shikohabad, Inayat Khan, son of Hafiz Rahmat Khan received the district of Etawah. This was then in the possession of the Marathas, and accordingly in 1762 a Rohilla force was sent under Mullah Mohsin Khan to wrest the assigned property from the Marathas. This force was opposed near the town of Etawah by Kishan Rao and Bala Rao Pandits, who were defeated and compelled to seek safety in flight across the Yamuna. Siege was then laid to the fort of Etawah by Mohsin Khan; but the fort was soon surrendered by its commander, and the district fell into the hands of the Rohillas.

The occupation, however, was merely nominal at first; the zamindars refused to pay revenue to Inayat Khan and, secure in their mud forts set his authority at defiance. Strong reinforcements were sent to the Rohillas, including some artillery, under Sheikh Kuber and Mullah Baz Khan, and many of the smaller forts were levelled to the grounds; but in their ravine fortresses the zamindars of Kamait in the trans-Yamuna tract still resisted the authority of Inayat Khan. Hafiz Rahmat and Inayat Khan then came in person to Etawah and operations were vigorously pressed against the refractory zamindars. Ultimately an annual tribute was agreed to by the latter. Hafiz Rahmat then departed to Bareilly, and Rohilla garrisons were established at convenient places in the district. Meanwhile, a new minister arose at Delhi called Najib Khan, better known as Najib-ud-daula, Amir-ul-umra, Shuja-ud-daula succeeded Safdar Jang as Nawab Wazir and occupied most of the Bangash possessions as far as Aligarh, with the exception of those granted by the Durrani to the Rohillas after he battle of Pandit. But the wazir's hostility to the Farrukhabad Afghans had not abated one jot, and in 1762 he persuaded Najib-ud-daula to join him in an attack on Farrukhabad. The attack was beaten off by the aid of Hafiz Rahmat Khan and matters once more settled down peacefully.

In 1766, the Marathas under Mulhar Rao, who had been awaiting their opportunity, once more crossed the Jamuna and attacked Phaphund, where a Rohilla force under Muhammad Hasan Khan eldest son of Mohsin Khan, was posted. On receipt of this news Hafiz Rahmat advanced from Bareilly to oppose the Marathas. He was joined near Phaphund by Sheikh Kuber, the Rohilla governor of Etawah, and prepared to give battle; but Mulhar Rao refused to risk an engagement and once more retired across the Jamuna. The ambitions Najib-ud-daula had been considerably irritated by the intervention of the Rohillas on behalf of Ahmad Khan Bangladesh in 1762; and though he had been too busily engaged otherwise to pursue his plans of revenge before, he began in 1770 to plot the downfall of Hafiz Rahmat Khan.

Accordingly, a Maratha army was invited to Delhi for the purpose of first wresting Farrukhabad from Ahmad Khan and of afterwards invading Rohikhand. The united forces of Najib-ud-daula and the Marathas advanced from Delhi; but at Koil Najib-ud-daula fell ill and retraced his steps, leaving his eldest son, Zabita Khan to operate with the Marathas. Zabita Khan however, was by no means disposed to fight against his brother Afghans. The Marathas, knowing this, kept him practically a prisoner in their camp and he requested Hafiz Rahmat Khan to obtain his release. Hafiz Rahmat Khan accordingly opened negotiations with the Marathas for the release of Zabita Khan; but the Maratha leaders demanded as their price the surrender of the jagirs of Etawah and Shikohabad. Hafiz Rahmat Khan was not disposed to agree to those terms, and while negotiations were proceeding for buying off the Marathas Zabita Khan escaped. Several desultory engagements now took place between the Marathas and the Afghan forces. Inayat khan was summoned by his father to Farrukhabad in order that he might be consulted regarding the surrendering of his jagirs. But although Dhunde Khan agreed to give up Shikohabad Inayat Khan refused to surrender Etawah.

Ultimately, disgusted with his father's arrangements he returned to Bareilly, and his father on his own responsibility sent orders to Sheikh Kuber, the Rohilla governor of Etawah, to surrender the fort to the Marathas. The Marathas now marched to Etawah, but as the orders had not yet reached him Sheikh Kuber gave them battle. Several desperate assaults were made on the fort of Etawah which were all beaten off, but finally it was handed over to the Marathas in accordance with hafiz Rahmat Khan's orders, and the Rohillas quit the district, leaving it once more in the hands of the Marathas. Later in the same year, 1771, the Marathas advanced to Delhi and reinstated the emperor Shah Alam, who had cast in his lot with them, on the throne. They were now masters of the empire and Zabita Khan determined to oppose them. Assembling his forces, he attacked the Marathas near Delhi but was signally defeated, and in 1772 the Marathas overran a large portion of Rohilkhand and captured Najafgarh, where Zabita Khan's family resided and his treasure lay.

Under the Government of Oudh
Zabita Khan then solicited the aid of Shuja-ud-daula, Nawab Wazir of Oudh; but the Nawab declined to interfere unless Hafiz Rahmat Khan applied on his behalf. Negotiations were commenced with Shah Alam and the Marathas for the restoration of Zabita Khan's family and the evacuation of Rohilkhand. The Marathas agreed to accept 40 lakhs of rupees, provided that Shuja-ud-daula made himself responsible for the payment; but Shuja-ud-daula now declined to enter into any such engagement unless Hafiz Rahmat Khan gave him a bond for the money. To this Hafiz Rahmat Khan consented, the bond was signed and the Marathas retired from Rohilkhand. In 1773, the Marathas proposed to attack Shuja-ud-daula and attempted to gain the help of Hifaz Rahmat Khan. The latter refused to him them. Instead he sent information to Shuja-ud-daula concerning what he had done, and on the strength of this requested restoration of his bond. Shuja-ud-daula expressed his approval of Hafiz Rahmat Khan's conduct and promised the restitution of the bond when the Marathas as had been defeated. The Marathas were defeated soon after at Asadpur by the combined forces of Shuja-ud-daula and Hafiz Rahmat Khan, with the result that they quit not only Rohilkhand but Delhi also.

Shuja-ud-daula then returned to Oudh, but denied ever having promised to restore the bond. He next seduced many of the Afghan Rohillas from their allegiance to Hafiz Rahmat Khan, and then proceeded to eject the Maratha garrisons from Etawah and Shikohabad in spite of Rahmat Khan's remonstrance. He ever went further and called on Hafiz Rahmat Khan to discharge the balance of 35 lakhs due on the bond. This was only a pretext for provoking hostilities for which purpose the Nawab had already begun to assemble an army; and Hafiz Rahmat Khan having failed to pay up, the Nawab advanced to the Ganges. The last scene in the tangled history of the period closed with the defeat of Hafiz Rahmat Khan by Shuja-ud-daula who was aided by a British force, at the battle of Miranpur Katra in the Shahjahanpur district on 23 April 1774 Etawah under the Oudh Government.

From 1774 to 1801, the district of Arvind remained under the government of Oudh. Little occurred to disturb it during this period and little is known regarding its history. For many years the administration of the district was in the hands of Mian Almas Ali Khan. Ails were stationed, we know, at Etawah, Kudarkot and Phaphunnd. One of those who held office at the last named placed was Raja Bhagmal or Baramal. The latter was by Caste a Jat and was sister's son to Almas Ali Khan, who was by birth a Hindu but was subsequently made a eunuch and converted to Islam. Raja Bhagmal built the fort at Phaphund and the old mosque which still bears an inscription recording thenamed of donor. Almas Ali Khan was, recording to Colonie Sleeman,"the greatest and best man" Oudh ever produced; be amassed great wealth, but having no descendant, he spent his money for the benefit of the people committed to his charge. He held court occasionally at Kudarkot where he built a fort, of which the massive ruins still remain. At Etawah the amils are said to have resided in the fort; but the building was destroyed by Shuja-ud-daula in consequence of the representations of the Etawah townspeople that, so long as the amils occupied such an impregnable residence, they would never do anything but oppress the people.

Geography

Boundaries and Area
The district of Auraiya lies in the southwestern portion of Uttar Pradesh 26° 21" and 27° 01" north latitude and 78° 45" and 79° 45" east longitude and forms a part of the Kanpur Division. It is bounded on the north by the districts of Kannauj, western border adjoins tehsil Bharthana of the Etawah district and the district of Gwalior. The eastern frontier marches with the district of Kanpur Dehat, and along the south lie Jalaun. The total area according to the statistics of 1991-92 is calculated to be 2054 square kilometers.

Topography

Auraiya lies entirely in the Gangetic plain, but its physical features vary considerably and are determined by the rivers which cross it. The area of Etawah and Auraiya districts is divisible into four portions of district natural characteristics. The first of these consists of the country lying north-east of the Senger river, which runs across it from west to east almost parallel to the Yamuna; it includes the northern portions of tahsils Etawah and Bharthana. The second tract lies south of the Senger and extends as far as the high lands immediately overlooking the Yamuna. It comprises a slightly undulating switch of country covering portions of Etawah and Bharthana and the bulk of an Auraiya Tehsil of Auraiya District. The tract includes the parts of some tehsils that adjoins the river Yamuna. Beyond the Yamuna, stretching from the borders of tahsil Bah in Agra to the confluence of the Sindh, Kuwari, Chambal and Yamuna rivers, lies the high and broken country formerly known as Janibrast. These tracts differ from each other in a very marked degree though each presents general conformity within its own limits.

Soils

In the Pachar and Ghar tracts the soils are broadly distinguishable into dumat or loam, matiyar or clay, and bhur or sand. Besides these are found everywhere low-lying beds of clay in which water collects during the rains and rice alone can be grown; these clay beds are known as Jhabar. In the Kurka and trans-Yamuna tract several other classes of soil are met with. In the ravines of the river and the land immediately adjacent to them are found fields full of kankar and gravel, the soil of which is called Pakar; this is in fact a sandy soil mixed with gravel. Below the ravines and in the wider valleys between them the soil that is flooded by the Yamuna is called kachhar; and along the edges of the streams there is a rich strip of alluvial deposit which is known as Tir. Both kachhar and tir vary greatly in quality: some patches of these soils consist of a rich reddish clay which lets at a high rental; other portions are composed of a dark colored loam; and others again are while and sandy in appearance and less fertile.

River System
The rivers and streams of the Auraiya and Etawah districts jointly consist of the Yamuna its two large affluents, the Chambal and, the Kuwari; the Sengar, and its tributary Sirsa; The Rind or Arind and its tributaries the Ahenya, the Puraha and the Pandu.

Demographics

As of 2011 India census, Auraiya had a population of 87,736. Males constitute 53% of the population and females 47%. Auraiya has an average literacy rate of 87.25%, higher than the national average of 74.37%; with 90.88% of the males and 83.23% of females literate. 12.16% of the population is under 6 years of age.

References

External links
 Official website

 
Cities and towns in Auraiya district